Saint Paul's Episcopal Chapel is a historic Episcopal church building in Mobile, Alabama, United States.  It was built in 1859 in a vernacular Gothic Revival style. The building was placed on the National Register of Historic Places as a part of the 19th Century Spring Hill Neighborhood Thematic Resource on October 18, 1984.

References

Churches completed in 1859
National Register of Historic Places in Mobile, Alabama
Churches in Mobile, Alabama
Episcopal church buildings in Alabama
Churches on the National Register of Historic Places in Alabama
Carpenter Gothic church buildings in Alabama
19th-century Episcopal church buildings
Episcopal chapels in the United States